The Delvina Government was the 5th ruling government of Albania, led by Sulejman Delvina. It was formed after the events at the Congress of Lushnjë which laid the foundation for the first democratic legislative elections to be held in the country the following year.

Legacy 
The administration of Sulejman Delvina expanded the role of government throughout the territory of Albania. It consolidated the rule of law, continued diplomatic negotiations to ensure the country's territorial integrity as defined by the London Treaty of 1913, expelled the presence of foreign troops and created new legislation to address its economic recovery efforts. It had a cabinet of eleven members which consisted of the following:

Cabinet

See also
 Politics of Albania
 Sulejman Delvina

References

G5